American Airlines Flight 320 was a scheduled flight between Chicago Midway International Airport and New York City's LaGuardia Airport. On February 3, 1959, the Lockheed L-188 Electra performing the flight crashed into the East River during its descent and approach to LaGuardia Airport, killing 65 of the 73 people on board. Weather conditions in the area were poor, which meant that the crew had to descend through dense clouds and fog. American Airlines had been flying the newly-developed Lockheed Electra in commercial service for only about two weeks before the accident.

Eyewitnesses to the accident reported that the aircraft was flying significantly lower than was normal for planes approaching the airport, but surviving flight crew members claimed that the aircraft's instruments had told them that the flight was operating at normal, safe altitudes right up to the moment of impact. An investigation by the Civil Aeronautics Board concluded that mistakes by the flight crew, the flight crew's inexperience flying the type of aircraft, and poor weather conditions were the causes of the crash. The Air Line Pilots Association contested the conclusion, countering that the crash was caused by faulty instruments and poor weather conditions, not by any mistakes made by the highly experienced flight crew.

Accident
American Airlines Flight 320 was a regularly-scheduled flight between Chicago and New York City using one of the company's newly obtained Lockheed L-188 Electra turbine propeller aircraft. The airline had first started flying the new aircraft in commercial service on January 23, 1959, and it offered six daily round-trip flights on its routes between New York and Chicago, with plans to expand to other routes once Lockheed was able to deliver more of the new aircraft.

On the evening of February 3, 1959, the flight was scheduled to leave Chicago's Midway Airport, but wind-driven snow delayed its departure. The flight was eventually airborne at 9:54p.m. EDT, fifty-four minutes late, and was one of the last flights to depart Chicago that evening before the airport was closed due to the storm. Sixty-eight passengers and five crew members were aboard, and the trip was expected to take one hour and forty-two minutes.

At 11:34p.m., the flight approached the New York City area. The tower controller instructed the flight to proceed to the north of the airport, and to prepare to perform a direct approach over the East River to land on runway 22. The flight crew acknowledged the clearance with a simple acknowledgement of "320", and there was no further radio communication.

A witness aboard a nearby tugboat reported seeing the aircraft flying very low over the river before it hit the water with a tremendous noise. A different crew member on the tugboat also saw the moment of impact, and stated that he thought that the aircraft had a nose-down angle at the time. He did not notice if the landing gear was down but he said he could see the whole underside and the lights in the windows of the aircraft. Surviving passengers and crew members in the main cabin said that the descent prior to the crash seemed to be uneventful and routine. Many residents in the area reported hearing the Electra fly overhead and had the impression that it was flying lower than planes usually did in the area.

The accident was the first crash involving the Lockheed L-188 Electra aircraft, which had begun commercial service at American Airlines in the previous weeks. It was the first significant accident involving an American Airlines aircraft since the crash of American Airlines Flight 327 on January 6, 1957.

Aftermath
A privately-owned tugboat from New England was on the river near the site of the crash when its crew saw and heard the impact. It cut loose the barges that it had been towing and was the first to arrive at the scene, illuminating the area with the boat's searchlight. At least a dozen boats from the Coast Guard and the police and two police helicopters arrived minutes later. In the dark fog, rescuers could hear screams from survivors, but poor visibility and swift river currents made recovery of victims and survivors extremely difficult. Responders and nearby residents in the area heard cries for help from locations considerably distant from the crash site.

Public safety agencies set up four rescue stations along the river to evacuate survivors, but ambulances that were taking injured survivors to hospitals had difficulty navigating the icy roads. Survivors were taken to Flushing Hospital and Queens General Hospital. Two temporary morgues were also set up on opposite sides of the river to receive victims.

By 5:00a.m. the next morning, at least 9 survivors had been recovered, 22 bodies had been located, and 39 other victims were still missing when the high winds and driving rain led to the decision to suspend the rescue operation. One of the survivors who had been taken to a hospital died of her injuries.  The New York Red Cross furnished supplies of rare blood types to aid the victims of the crash. Bodies that had been recovered were taken to Queens General Hospital for identification with assistance by agents from the Federal Bureau of Investigation and 25 city detectives. The agents used fingerprint records from its immigration, personal identification, and war service files to help identify the victims.

After the impact, the body of the aircraft had broken into several pieces, with a  section of the fuselage the largest intact piece. After two hours, only  of the tail of the aircraft was visible above the surface of the water. Searchers on boats and on the shore picked up plane debris, personal belongings, and mail that had been aboard.

In Washington, D.C., the Civil Aeronautics Board (CAB) dispatched two investigators as soon as authorities became aware of the crash, and ordered the airline's records to be impounded. An additional team of 25 investigators was assembled and dispatched later the next day. The team was given the task of investigating all aspects of the flight, including the weather, flight operations, engines and propellers, flight instruments, and aircraft structures. Queens County District Attorney Frank O'Connor also started an inquiry about how the rescue efforts could have been improved, stating that having a system of rescue boats available to serve the city's two airports may have helped. The House Interstate and Foreign Commerce Committee asked the head of the Federal Aviation Agency (FAA) to report on the accident in a closed session in the days after the accident. After the two and a half hour meeting, a special House subcommittee was named to investigate the crash and the overall safety issues raised by the transition to jet and turboprop aircraft.

Days after the crash, reports surfaced that there were safety systems that could have helped prevent the crash if they had been in place at the airport. A representative of the Air Line Pilots Association said that a system of flashing lights known as the Electronic Flash Approach System could have helped the pilot judge his altitude, if it had been installed. The association also called for the installation of a more comprehensive instrument landing system that would have provided altitude and horizontal guidance to flight crews landing on runway 22.  The system in place at the time of the accident only provided horizontal guidance, although such a system was already installed for the same runway for aircraft approaching from the opposite direction. At the time, there were only two airports in the United States that had such a system installed for approaches on both directions of a runway. At a meeting on February 5, commissioners of the Port of New York Authority explained that the installation of such systems on runway 22 was considered to be very difficult because the approach lighting system would block the waterway used by ships to reach docks in Queens.

Aircraft

The aircraft was a Lockheed L-188 Electra turbine propeller aircraft, serial number 1015, registered as tail number N6101A. This was the first Electra delivered to American Airlines. Construction had been completed by the Lockheed Aircraft Corporation on November 27, 1958. At the time of the crash, the aircraft had flown for a total of 302 hours. It was powered by four Allison 501-D13 engines.

Promoted as an efficient, fast, and profitable aircraft, the Electra was the first turbine propeller aircraft to be produced in the United States. The first plane was delivered to Eastern Air Lines in October1958, who began operating commercial flights with the aircraft on January 1, 1959. American Airlines took delivery of its first Electra in December1958, and its first commercial flight was twelve days before the crash. After the crash of American Airlines flight 320, two more Electras crashed in the following months after suffering catastrophic structural failures, killing all of the occupants. Braniff Flight 542 crashed in September1959, and Northwest Orient Airlines Flight 710 crashed in March1960. After extensive research, Lockheed identified and corrected a flaw in the engine mounts which had been the cause of the structural failures of the other two crashes.  However, the negative publicity surrounding all of the accidents within a short period of time led to the loss of public confidence in the safety of the aircraft, and only 174 were ever produced.

Passengers and crew
The flight carried 68 passengers and 5 crew members, all residents of the United States. Of the 68 passengers, 5 survived. The bodies of two of the victims were never recovered. One of the two flight attendants and the captain of the flight died in the crash. One of the crash victims was Beulah Zachary, the executive producer of the television series Kukla, Fran and Ollie, which was broadcast from 1947 to 1957. Also aboard the plane was Robert Emerson, a research professor at the University of Illinois who was internationally known for his research into plant photosynthesis, and Herbert Greenwald, a Chicago real estate developer.

The pilot of the flight, Captain Albert Hunt DeWitt, was 59 years old. He started his career at American Airlines in 1929 by flying for the Thompson Aeronautical Corporation of Cleveland, which was later acquired by American. A resident of Decatur, Michigan, he was qualified to fly all of the aircraft that had been operated by American Airlines and was considered one of the most experienced commercial pilots in the world, with seven million miles flown. He had a total of 28,135 hours of flight experience, including 48 hours in the Lockheed Electra and 2,500 hours of instrument time, and had at one time acted as one of American's chief pilots in the New York area. He learned to fly airplanes when he was 24 years old. In 1930, he had been involved in an accident while he was flying a mail plane over Mishawaka, Indiana, on his way to Chicago. Caught in a severe snowstorm, his aircraft stalled and entered a spin, but he was able to jump out of his plane before it crashed and he landed in a 75-foot-high tree. Before joining American Airlines, he had been a barnstormer in Indiana and Michigan and had been an instructor for various flying schools and clubs in the 1920s. He served in both World Wars; in World War I, he was a motorcycle courier, and during World War II, he served as an instructor at flight schools in New York and Chicago. He had planned to retire that May, but did not survive the crash of Flight 320. His cause of death was listed as drowning, but the medical examiner stated that he had also suffered severe internal injuries that would probably have been fatal had he not drowned.

The first officer, 33-year-old Frank Hlavacek, was a resident of Wilmette, Illinois, and had been employed with the company for eight years. He had a total of 10,192 logged hours, of which 36 hours were in the Electra. He had been flying since he was 14 years old and had served with the United States Army Air Forces in World War II. Before joining American Airlines, he had owned his own air service based in La Jolla, California. After the crash, he helped two of the survivors reach the remnants of the plane's wing, where they were rescued. He suffered fractures to his jaw, pelvis, and both legs in the crash as well as internal injuries, but eventually recovered and returned to work at American Airlines.

The flight engineer, Warren Cook, was 36 years old and had been working for American Airlines for eleven years. He had a total of 8,700 flying hours, of which 81 were in the Electra. He served in the United States Army Air Corps from 1940 to 1945. In the accident, he suffered a badly wrenched back, cuts, and bruises. After recovering from his injuries, he returned to work at American Airlines.

Crash investigation
Within two hours of the accident, investigators conducted an interview with flight engineer Warren Cook, in which he stated that the flight's descent was completely routine right up to the point where the aircraft unexpectedly hit the water. They were unable to immediately interview first officer Frank Hlavacek because of his medical condition, but when interviewed several days later, he told investigators that he had been calling out indicated altitudes to Captain DeWitt during the descent in  increments as they approached the runway. He said that he had barely gotten the words out for five hundred feet when the plane struck the river. Cook's statement to investigators, taken independently at a separate hospital, confirmed that they struck the river just as Hlavacek was saying "five hundred feet".

Recovery of the wreckage of the aircraft began as soon as weather conditions permitted, with 25 percent of the plane recovered by February 5, and 50 percent by the following day. The day after the crash, salvage cranes attempted to raise the fuselage of the aircraft to the surface of the water, but they were only briefly successful before it broke apart and most of it fell back into the water. The tail section was raised by crews on the evening of February 5, and newspaper articles reported that the damage to that section suggested that the aircraft may have crashed in a "nose up" position, as though the pilot had noticed at the last minute that he was well short of the runway. Divers were brought in to locate missing sections of the aircraft beneath the surface of the water, but recovery efforts were hindered by high winds, strong river currents, and murky waters. Each piece was identified, tagged, and cleaned off, and relocated to Hangar 9 of the Marine Air Terminal of LaGuardia Airport. The nose section and cockpit were recovered late on February 7. The cockpit was salvaged in good condition, with the spring-wound clock on the instrument panel still working when the section was recovered from the river. Investigators predicted that it would take at least two weeks to check all of the instruments to determine if they were functioning correctly at the time of the accident. Early reports from the investigation revealed that the condition of the flight control surfaces revealed that at the time of impact, the aircraft had not been in a violent turn or dive when it hit the water.

Altimeter concerns
On February 9, the FAA announced that flying restrictions would be put in place on bad-weather landings by Lockheed Electra aircraft. The restrictions increased the minimum visibility conditions required for landing in poor conditions. In communications with flight crews, both American Airlines and Eastern Airlines described the restrictions as temporary, likely lasting only a few days. Lockheed Aircraft Corporation expressed disappointment in the new restrictions, but agreed to cooperate with the investigation to the fullest extent. The following day, the Agency reversed course, and said that the Electra airliners could resume normal operation if they replaced the new altimeters with old-style altimeters. Both airlines agreed to immediately replace the altimeters as a precautionary step. The Agency also extended the order to include the requirement that new-style altimeters that had been installed in Boeing 707 aircraft needed to be replaced.

The altimeters used in the aircraft had been an early focus of the investigation. The units that Lockheed had used in its Electra turboprops were a different style than what had been used in older piston-type aircraft. The older type used three hands of different lengths to indicate the aircraft's altitude, but the new design combined an analog gauge with graduations indicating hundreds of feet, and a rectangular display with numbers printed on rotating drums that indicated the thousands of feet. The Kollsman Instrument Corporation, which built both types, described the new style as a "precision drum altimeter" and said that it had been "developed as a result of a human engineering study made by the Aero Medical Laboratory, by an unnamed government body, and at the instigation of the Air Force, primarily to meet the needs of faster flying." The Air Force had reported multiple cases where its pilots had misread the older-style altimeters and had misinterpreted their altitude by 10,000 feet. On the other hand, pilots training on newer aircraft reported several instances where they had misread the altitude on the new-style altimeters, causing them to misread the aircraft's altitude by up to 1,000 feet. Because of the confusion, early reports said that the airline had made plans to install an additional third altimeter of the old type in the center of the pilot's panel while continuing to use the newer style altimeters. Pilots for Eastern Airlines who had been flying the Electra aircraft also complained about the new style of altimeter, stating that not only were they easy to misinterpret, but they tended to lag behind the older style. That airline had installed a third, old-style, altimeter in their cockpits. American Airlines defended the new style altimeter as "a new and far superior altimeter with finer gradations" and denied that it had received complaints with the instruments. It acknowledged that it had planned to install a third altimeter in the center of the cockpits, but that the third unit was planned to be a new-style model. At the time of the accident, the aircraft in Flight 320 still only had the two original altimeters.

An investigative hearing of the CAB began in New York City on March 18, 1959. In testimony before the board, first officer Hlavacek confirmed the information that he had given in his earlier interviews and stated that he and the other crew members had checked their altimeters several times during the flight, including when they passed by Newark, New Jersey, saying that his and the pilot's altimeter were very close. He said that at the time of the crash, the pilot had been using the automatic pilot with partial manual control during the approach, and also said that some ice had formed at the top of the windshield, but it had not been considered serious. He said that he had not seen any sign of the runway through the windshield ahead, but that he had caught sight of a few reddish lights flashing past his side windows just before impact. The investigative board confronted flight engineer Cook with transcripts of an interview that he had given immediately after the accident, in which he stated that the aircraft's altimeter had shown under one hundred feet at the time of impact, but he had later testified that it showed five hundred feet. Cook stated that at the time, he was in a state of shock and that in his mind he had mistaken the one on the drum to mean one hundred feet instead of one thousand feet. He confirmed that he had turned on de-icing equipment before the plane had started its descent, and confirmed that the pilot had been using the automatic pilot to fly the plane during the descent. He said that he had been flying with Captain Dewitt since 1951, that he knew him well, and that it was the pilot's custom to use the automatic pilot to descend until about 400 feet above the runway, at which point he would switch to manual control. He also testified that he had seen nothing but blackness through the windshield up to the time of the crash.

Accident investigators took the altimeters that were recovered from the crash to the instrument shop at La Guardia Airport for a detailed examination. On February 26, an article in the Chicago Tribune reported that after the altimeters had been cleaned of corrosion, water, and dirt, they had been tested in a pressure chamber. According to the article, both of the devices functioned normally down to 1,000 feet above ground pressure level, but below 1,000 feet they stuck or lagged considerably. However, in official testimony before the board, the manufacturer of the altimeters submitted a report to the board that said that their investigation concluded that the instruments did not have any mechanical failure or malfunction before the crash. When they had been salvaged from the water, the pilot's and co-pilot's instruments had indicated minus 1,500 feet and minus 1,640 feet respectively, reflecting damage to parts of the instruments caused by immersion pressure. When questioned, the investigator acknowledged that there was no means to determine what the altimeters showed at the time of impact. In testimony before the CAB, the American Airlines's director of flying said that the identical malfunction of two altimeters at the same time was "almost mathematically impossible". The CAB heard from experts from the Lockheed Aircraft Corporation who had attempted to reproduce a 500-foot error in the reported altitude caused by ice buildup in the air pressure lines that provide the input data to the altimeters. They flew an Electra plane behind an Air Force tanker that was spraying ice-producing water to see if they could cause the pressure line to clog. In other tests, they artificially plugged the line, used different tools to disrupt the airflow into the port, and even had a mechanic spray a stream of water directly into the pressure port. None of the tests produced the 500-foot error that was reported by the pilots, and produced a maximum error of only of 40 or 50 feet.

In trying to determine why the crew of the Electra had not seen the runway ahead of them, the CAB heard from two pilots of a Northeast Airlines DC-3 that had landed at La Guardia Airport a minute or two in front of the Electra. They testified that they had had no problem coming in under the 400-foot cloud ceiling and that they could see the whole mile-long runway ahead of them. However, interviews with crash survivors and crew members of the rescue tug suggested that an isolated patch of low clouds and fog was hanging over the river at the time of the crash.

Final report
The CAB released a final report on the accident on January 10, 1960. The investigators concluded that the crew had been preoccupied with aspects of the flight and had neglected to monitor essential flight instruments during the descent, leading to a premature descent below landing minimums. Contributing to the accident were factors including the crew's limited experience with the aircraft type, a faulty approach technique in which the autopilot was used to or almost to the surface, an erroneous setting of the pilot's altimeter, marginal weather in the approach area, possible misinterpretation of the altimeter and the rate of descent indicators on the aircraft, and the crew's sensory illusion with respect to height and altitude resulting from a lack of visual references. The board was critical of the airline's lack of adequate simulator training on the aircraft before placing it into passenger service, and made recommendations to the FAA that all large turbine-engine aircraft used in air transportation be equipped with a flight data recorder.

Over 90 percent of the primary structural components of the aircraft and most of the system's components were recovered by investigators. They found that at the moment of impact, the flaps were approximately in the approach position, the landing gear was extended, and propeller blade angles were relatively uniform and consistent with the power readings obtained from the recovered aircraft instruments and consistent with the testimony of the crew regarding the power being used during the approach. Neither of the two vertical speed indicator mechanisms were recovered. Both altimeters were recovered, but since the diaphragms of both had been overstressed due to submersion, it was impossible to establish the calibration or accuracy of either altimeter before the crash.

Investigators obtained all of the maintenance records including pilot complaints of all operators, civil and military, of the type of altimeter used in the flight. None of the reported incidents involved more than one of the altimeters installed at a time, and after reviewing the possibility of a simultaneous failure of both altimeters, the CAB concluded that it would involve such an extreme mathematical improbability that it chose to reject that theory as well as reject portions of the testimony of the surviving crew members. It also concluded that after consideration of all possible scenarios, that a failure of just one of the altimeters was also unlikely to have occurred. Based upon eyewitness testimony and analysis of the point of impact, the CAB concluded that it was likely that one or more of the pilots had misread the altimeter due to their unfamiliarity with the new style. It also concluded that there was a possibility that the crew had misread the vertical speed indicators, which also used a different scale than what had been used in older aircraft or in the training received by the captain.

The CAB concluded that all of the required airport, boundary, and runway lights were on and functioning at the time of the accident. However, because the lights were slanted upward at between three and five degrees, and because of a dike located between the end of runway 22 and the water, the CAB concluded that they would not have been visible to the crew because of the aircraft's premature descent below the cloud level.

The CAB's conclusions were soundly criticized by the president of the Air Line Pilots Association, who called the report "grossly inaccurate in a number of respects", and that the report failed to satisfactorily explain the reason for the accident and assumed factors that had not been established by fact. He said that pilots at American Airlines were united in protest against the report, saying it "slandered and wrongfully accused" crew members of the plane, and was aimed at "conveniently writing the accident off the books" rather than accurately determining a cause. He said that in the association's judgement, the crash was the result of marginal weather conditions and inadequate approach and lighting aids at the airport. First officer Frank Hlavacek said he was "furious" over the CAB report, saying the board tried to take the easy way out by blaming a dead captain. He said he hoped that American Airlines would protest the report.

Additional investigations
On February 6, 1959, a special House subcommittee was named to investigate the crash and overall safety issues that the aviation industry was experiencing while transitioning from piston aircraft to jet and turboprop aircraft. The subcommittee was headed by Representative John Bell Williams of Mississippi, a former World War II bomber pilot. Representative Oren Harris of Arkansas said the subcommittee would look into the equipment that was being used on the new aircraft as well as the training of their crews. The five members of the subcommittee visited LaGuardia Field on February 12, and inspected the runway where Flight 320 had been trying to reach, but refused to publicly discuss the results of their investigation. In March, the committee announced that it was investigating the FAA for suppressing information that the committee had requested about the difficulties that had been encountered with the new type of altimeters used in the Lockheed Electra and Boeing 707 aircraft.

During hearings of the aviation subcommittee of the Senate Commerce Committee in January1960, the safety director for the CAB testified that had the LaGuardia runway been equipped with high intensity lights, "the accident probably would not have happened". He also advocated for more training of copilots of aircraft and the installation of electronic flight recorders in aircraft to assist with accident investigations. As a result of the testimony, three of the senators on the subcommittee called for the installation of modern lighting systems at Chicago's Midway Airport and other landing fields, and the implementation of requirements that copilots be certified on the aircraft they fly. Elwood Richard Quesada, administrator of the FAA, testified that the government had pledged to pay 75 percent of the cost to install high intensity lighting and radar approaches at La Guardia prior to the accident, but that officials at the airport had declined to pay the 25 percent required for local cooperation.

Notes

References

Airliner accidents and incidents caused by pilot error
Aviation accidents and incidents in the United States in 1959
Aviation accidents and incidents involving controlled flight into terrain
February 1959 events in the United States
1959 in New York City
320
Accidents and incidents involving the Lockheed L-188 Electra
Airliner accidents and incidents in New York City
LaGuardia Airport